Chetana may refer to:

Chetana Das, Indian actress
Chetana (Surat), Gujarati language monthly
Chetana Jagrati Punj, welfare society
Chetana Nagavajara, Thai academic
Chetana (theatre group), a renounced Indian theatre group based on Kolkata, West Bengal